Associazione Calcio Milan returned to its winning ways with the appointment of Fabio Capello as the club's new manager during the 1991–92 season, following the departure of Arrigo Sacchi. Marco van Basten had his last season uninterrupted by injury, netting 25 goals, which was one of the main reasons Milan was able to overhaul Juventus to claim the Serie A title. Milan ran through entire the 34–game league season unbeaten, a rare feat in footballing history (equalled in Serie A only by Juventus in the 2011–12 season, and Perugia in 1978–79, although the latter side failed to win the Serie A title). The team's unbeaten run totalled 58 matches between 1991 and 1993, a record in Italian football, encompassing the next season as well. For their achievements, the 1991–92 Milan side received the nickname "Gli invincibili" ("The invincibles," in Italian) in the media.

Squad

Transfers

Winter

Competitions

Serie A

League table

Results by round

Matches

Coppa Italia

Round of 16

Eightfinals

Quarterfinals

Semifinals

Statistics

Players statistics

Goalscorers
  Marco van Basten 25
  Daniele Massaro 9
  Ruud Gullit 7
  Marco Simone 6
  Frank Rijkaard 5

See also
List of unbeaten football club seasons

References

A.C. Milan seasons
Milan
1992